The  Little League World Series took place between August 20 and August 23 in Williamsport, Pennsylvania. The Lakewood Little League of Lakewood, New Jersey, defeated the Belmont Heights Little League of Tampa, Florida, in the championship game of the 29th Little League World Series.

This was the only LLWS in which Little League Baseball banned all non-US teams from the tournament, due to allegations of teams from Taiwan using out-of-district players. After an uproar of criticism and an investigation that could produce no evidence of rules violations, the ban was rescinded for the  event. Only three games were played in the tournament, consisting of two semi-final games and the championship game.  The third-place game was forfeited. This was the last tournament not to feature international teams until 2021, which came about during the COVID-19 pandemic in the United States.

Teams

Bracket

Champions path
The Lakewood LL went undefeated, winning all four games to reach the LLWS. In total, their record was 6–0.

Notable players
Vance Lovelace (Tampa, Florida) - Played in the MLB for the California Angels and Seattle Mariners from 1988-90.
Albert Everett (Tampa, Florida) - Drafted in the 21st Round of the 1981 MLB Draft by the Minnesota Twins.  Brother of Carl Everett.

References

Further reading

External links
1975 Little League World Series
Line scores for the 1975 LLWS

Little League World Series
Little League World Series
Little League World Series